Can't Buy Me Love is a 1987 American teen romantic comedy film directed by Steve Rash, starring Patrick Dempsey and Amanda Peterson in a story about a nerd at a high school in Tucson, Arizona, who gives a cheerleader $1,000 to pretend to be his girlfriend for a month. The film takes its title from a Beatles song of the same title.

Plot
Ronald Miller is a typical high school nerd living in suburban Tucson, Arizona. He has spent all summer mowing lawns to save up for a telescope. At an opportune moment, he makes a deal with next-door neighbor and popular cheerleader Cindy Mancini. She had borrowed her mother's expensive suede outfit without permission to wear to a party, only to have wine accidentally spilled on it. Cindy reluctantly agrees to help Ronald look "cool" by posing as his girlfriend for a month for $1,000 (which was used to replace the ruined outfit), although she already has a boyfriend, Bobby, who is attending the University of Iowa.

Ronald then trades his nerdy, yet loyal, friends for the popular but shallow students, and undergoes a complete clothing and hair makeover under Cindy's direction. Over time, a bond develops between them. Cindy has Ronald read a secret poem she wrote that means a great deal to her. In turn, Ronald reveals his interests in astronomy and space travel. On their last date that Ronald paid for, Cindy begins to have real feelings for him and hints that she would like to kiss him, but he misunderstands. The next day at school, they stage a breakup in front of a crowd, but Ronald takes things too far and says some hurtful things about Cindy in front of her friends. She remains calm and distant, but informs Ronald that popularity is hard work and that he needs to make sure that he "stays himself." The next day, Cindy notices him behaving arrogantly at school, and becomes jealous when she sees him flirting with her best friends Barbara and Patty.

Ronald takes Patty to a school dance, where he performs a dance he learned from an African cultural show on public television he mistakenly thought was the latest dance craze performed on American Bandstand. At first, the other kids are mystified, but they soon join in, and Ronald's new "trendy" dancing further increases his popularity. On Halloween night, he and some jocks drive to the house of Kenneth, Ronald's best friend, where the jocks test his loyalty by coercing him to hurl dog feces at Kenneth's house. Kenneth is lying in wait and catches Ronald, but lets him go before his father can call the police. Kenneth ignores him the next day at school.

At a New Year's Eve party at Big John's house, Ronald starts drinking and has a romantic tryst with his date, Iris, in the bathroom. Cindy walks by and hears Ronald reciting her special poem to Iris. Devastated, Cindy starts drinking even more. Later, Cindy's boyfriend, Bobby, unexpectedly shows up at the party. After Bobby learns about Cindy's "relationship" with Ronald, he breaks up with her. Cindy tries to explain that Ronald paid her to pretend they were dating, but Bobby does not believe her and walks out on her. In a drunken rage, Cindy reveals the truth about her and Ronald to the partygoers, and Ronald is immediately ostracized. Dejected, he leaves and spends the night in his garage crying himself to sleep. When school resumes, he finds himself a social outcast, by both the jocks and the nerds. His attempts to reconcile with both Cindy and Kenneth are rebuffed.

Ronald gets an opportunity to redeem himself at lunch when he sees Quint, a jock, bullying Kenneth after noticing Kenneth helping Patty with her math homework. Quint threatens Kenneth with physical violence if Kenneth does not go back to "his side of the cafeteria." Ronald intervenes, threatening to break Quint's pitching arm if he does not leave Kenneth alone. Ronald points out that the three were all friends at one time: when they were nine, Quint fell out of their treehouse and broke his arm and Kenneth and Ronald carried him twelve blocks to the hospital. Ronald confesses he was desperate to run with the popular crowd but had messed up by trying to buy his way in (unlike Kenneth, who was helping Patty out of a genuine interest in her), that the clique dynamic is "all bullshit" and that it is tough enough just being yourself, and walks away. Quint apologizes to Kenneth and they shake hands as the whole school applauds. Ronald officially redeems himself with his friends and Cindy.

Recognizing Ronald's worth, Cindy chooses to spend an evening with him rather than hang out with her friends, hopping on the back of his riding lawnmower. Ronald then asks Cindy to prom, and they kiss for the first time, as the Beatles' title song plays. The new couple then ride off into the sunset on the lawnmower.

Cast

Production notes
The film was shot on location in Tucson, Arizona, at Tucson High Magnet School (then known as Tucson High School). The choreography is by Paula Abdul, who makes an uncredited appearance as a dancer.

On a date where the main characters begin to bond, they jump the perimeter wall and explore the 309th Aerospace Maintenance and Regeneration Group Aircraft Bone Yard on Davis–Monthan Air Force Base that contains 4,400 aircraft.

The film was originally titled Boy Rents Girl but was changed when rights to The Beatles song of the same name were obtained.

Critical reception
Can't Buy Me Love received mixed reviews from critics. Caryn James, in The New York Times, wrote that the film missed its mark and traded its potential originality for a bid at popularity: 
Roger Ebert gave the film a half star out of a possible 4: 

Rotten Tomatoes has a rating of 50% based on 24 critics with the consensus: "While Can't Buy Me Love gets some value out of its plucky leads, this romantic comedy struggles to find grace in a cynical conceit that belongs in the bargain bin." In 2006, it ranked number 41 on Entertainment Weekly's list of the 50 Best High School Movies.

Awards
Young Artist Award
 Won: Best Young Actor in a Motion Picture—Comedy, Patrick Dempsey
 Nominated: Best Young Actress in a Motion Picture—Comedy, Amanda Peterson
 Nominated: Best Young Actress in a Motion Picture—Comedy, Tina Caspary
 Nominated: Best Family Motion Picture—Comedy

Home media
Touchstone Home Entertainment released the film on VHS and DVD on August 14, 2002.

As of June 2022, it is available for streaming via Disney+ in Canada, and previously on Netflix, Cinemax, Tubi, Hulu, and The Roku Channel in the US.

Soundtrack
In 2013, Intrada Records released Robert Folk's complete score for the film on a limited edition CD paired with David Newman's work for Paradise.

Remake
In 2003, Can't Buy Me Love was remade as Love Don't Cost a Thing starring Nick Cannon and Christina Milian. Though the triggering event differs between the two films, many of the aspects/scenes from the original film are reinterpreted in this remake, such as the eating of raw egg in the Home Economics classroom, as well as the cheerleader telling the bully that he is sitting in the wrong section in the cafeteria that he needs to sit in the "asshole section" of the cafeteria.

References

External links

 
 
 
 

1987 films
1980s coming-of-age comedy films
1980s high school films
1987 romantic comedy films
1980s teen comedy films
1980s teen romance films
American coming-of-age comedy films
American high school films
American romantic comedy films
American teen comedy films
American teen romance films
Coming-of-age romance films
1980s English-language films
Films about proms
Films directed by Steve Rash
Films scored by Robert Folk
Films set in Tucson, Arizona
Films shot in Tucson, Arizona
Touchstone Pictures films
1980s American films